Cartoon Network Amazone Waterpark was a Cartoon Network themed waterpark located at 888 Moo 8, Na Jomtien, Sattahip, Chonburi, Thailand, 15 kilometers away from South Pattaya. The park recreated an atmosphere of the Amazon rainforest with attractions and activities such as water slides, themed dining options, an artificial sea, rafting, flowriding and live shows, all featuring Cartoon Network characters like: Ben 10 and his aliens, Adventure Time's Finn and Jake, The Powerpuff Girls, and Johnny Bravo.

The park halted operations on 24 March 2020 due to the COVID-19 pandemic in Thailand, and announced in 2021 that it would cease operating as the Cartoon Network Amazone. It has since been rebranded as the Columbia Pictures Aquaverse, themed to Sony Pictures properties.

History 
Cartoon Network Amazone Waterpark was operated by Amazon Falls Company Limited. The waterpark's construction began in 2012 by the main road in Na Jomtien close to Bang Saray beach. The waterpark's opening date was originally scheduled in the Fourth quarter of 2013, but was postponed due to the delayed construction. In August 2014 the park was opened only for annual pass members and invited guests. On Friday, October 3, 2014, Cartoon Network Amazone opened to the public.

What to Expect 
Cartoon Network Amazone Pattaya is the world's first Cartoon Network-themed waterpark. Based on the popular children's channel, this family-friendly water park is sure to excite thrill-seekers and animation fanatics! With the Cartoon Network Amazone ticket, you can splash out with all of your favorite Cartoon Network friends, including Adventure Time's Finn and Jake characters, The Powerpuff Girls, Johnny Bravo and many more. This unique park will have you free-falling 17 meters, hurtling to a splash landing from 23.4 meters, braving the Riptide Rapids, riding out the Mega Wave and exploring the splashtastic slides and fountains at the kids-only Cartoonival. If you're looking for things to do with kids in Pattaya, the Cartoon Network Amazone waterpark should be high in your itinerary!

Zones and Attractions 

Cartoon Network Amazone waterpark was divided into six zones. There were three zones with water slides including the Omniverse Zone, Adventure Zone, and Cartoonival Zone, which comprised eighteen slides in total. The three zones without water slides were Mega Wave, Riptide Rapids, and Surf Arena. All slides were supplied by Polin Waterparks.

Omniverse Zone 
The largest zone of the park included six water slides inspired by characters from Ben 10.

Humungaslide - A dual-lane raft slide inspired by Ultimate Humungousaur. It sent 2 riders through twists and turns, then dropped them from 8 meters high at a speed of 51 km/hr.
Intergalactic Racers - A multi-lane slide inspired by Bloxx. Four riders would lie headfirst on mats racing each other from series of bumps, twists and serpentine tubes to the final open flume.
Goop Loop - The ride started in Goop's enclosed capsule where a trap door released below the feet, dropping the rider into a 12-meter free-fall, then propelling them into a 360-degree loop.
XLR8-TOR - A pipe-style water slide that plunged riders from a height of 18 meters.

Alien Attack - Two people took rafts through a 110-meter long water slide. It was divided into three parts, each denoting a different character theme. Each of them consisted of twists and turns connected by large space shuttles.
The Omnitrix - The ride started as four riders riding a raft through a long twisted tube into a 23-meter tall sphere, featuring digital projection and surround sound. It was inspired by Ben 10's famous alien device.

Adventure Zone 
The Adventure Zone housed three water slides, featuring characters from Adventure Time and Johnny Bravo.

Jake Jump - Jake's huge yellow slide. 2 riders ride a dual raft down from a tall and steep flume. The speed propelled riders into Jake's face before bouncing back into a pool below.
Banana Spin - Jake Spidermonkey and Johnny Bravo's green gigantic bowl would swing a raft around before it drifted into a plunge pool.

Rainfall Rainicorn - A short ride, inspired by Adventure Time's Lady Rainicorn as a couple riding raft from steep flume into a splash pool landing.

Cartoonival 
A zone for children featuring characters from The Powerpuff Girls, Ben 10, Chowder, The Amazing World of Gumball, and Dexter's Laboratory. It included nine water slides and other water features such as Disco Fountain Rain Fortress.

Mega Wave 
A large wave pool.

Riptide Rapids 
A 335-meter long lazy river that wrapped around Omniverse Zone and Adventure Zone, which could be traversed by raft. It was surrounded by flowers and palm trees.

Surf Arena 
A dual-lane flow riding surf simulator.

Live Shows 
Besides all the attractions in Cartoon Network Amazone waterpark, there were various live entertainment from costumed versions of characters from Cartoon Network's famous shows.

References 

Water parks in Thailand
Amusement parks in Thailand
Warner Bros. Global Brands and Experiences
Cartoon Network